Estonian Triathlon Association (abbreviation ETA) is one of the sport governing bodies in Estonia which deals with triathlon.

ETA is established in 1988. ETA is a member of World Triathlon.

References

External links
 
Estonian Triathlon Association Europe Triathlon

Sports governing bodies in Estonia
Triathlon in Estonia
Sports organizations established in 1988
National members of the European Triathlon Union